The 2007 Women's Hockey Asia Cup was the sixth tournament of the Women's Hockey Asia Cup. It was held in Hong Kong from 1 September to 9 September 2007.

Japan defeated South Korea to win the title. While China took third place after beating India.

Pools
All times are Hong Kong Time (UTC +8).

Pool A

Pool B

Fifth to eighth place classification

Crossover

Seventh and eighth place

Fifth and sixth place

First to fourth place classification

Semi finals

Third and fourth place

Final

Final standings

External links
Official website

Women's Hockey Asia Cup
Asia Cup
Hockey Asia Cup
International field hockey competitions hosted by Hong Kong
Hockey Asia Cup